This list includes completed skyscrapers in Latin America that reach a height of  or taller. As of 2023, there are 45 buildings that meet this criterion, 23 of which are located in Panama City, Panama.

Tallest buildings

See also
List of tallest buildings in North America
List of tallest buildings in Central America
List of tallest buildings in South America

References

Latin
Latin
Tallest buildings